Aigrefeuille is a commune in the Haute-Garonne department in southwestern France.

Geography
The commune is bordered by four other communes: Drémil-Lafage to the north, Sainte-Foy-d'Aigrefeuille to the southeast, Lauzerville to the southwest, and finally by Quint-Fonsegrives to the west.

Population

The inhabitants of the commune are known as Aigrefeuillois.

See also
Communes of the Haute-Garonne department

References

Communes of Haute-Garonne